Old Chinatown could refer to one of the following places:
 Chinatown, San Francisco
 First Chinatown, Toronto
 Old Chinatown, Los Angeles
 Old Chinatown, San Diego
 Old Chinatown, Cleveland